The white-rumped kingfisher or glittering kingfisher (Caridonax fulgidus) is a species of bird in the family Alcedinidae. It is monotypic within the genus Caridonax. It is endemic to Indonesia, where its natural habitats are subtropical or tropical moist lowland forest and subtropical or tropical moist montane forest.

Description 
It is dark blue all over, except its underside and rump, which are white. It has a red bill and feet. Its eyes are dark brown.

References

White-rumped  kingfisher
Birds of the Lesser Sunda Islands
Flores Island (Indonesia)
White-rumped  kingfisher
Taxonomy articles created by Polbot